New York Bar or New York bar may refer to:
 New York State Bar Association
 New York City Bar Association, association of lawyers and law students
 Harry's New York Bar in Paris, formerly known as the New York Bar
 Taverns in New York City